Kingdom Blow is the seventh studio album by the American hip hop musician Kurtis Blow, released in 1986.

The album peaked at No. 196 on the Billboard 200.

Production
The album was produced by Kurtis Blow. It contains a few guest appearances. Bob Dylan raps on "Street Rock". He performed his lines in one take, at his Malibu home. Robert Reed, of Trouble Funk, appears on "I'm Chillin"; George Clinton appears on "Magilla Gorilla".

Critical reception
Opining that Blow "is nothing if not open-minded and adventurous," Trouser Press wrote that "the eight long cuts, some more compelling than others, throw in just about everything (TV bites, Donald Duck, party sounds, Emulator gimmickry, etc.)." The Philadelphia Inquirer thought that "the one stand-out song is already looking like a left-field pop hit: 'I'm Chillin' ', which combines a clever rap with the funky go-go music of the Washington band Trouble Funk."

Track listing

References

1986 albums
Kurtis Blow albums
Mercury Records albums